TV Bahia (channel 11) is a television station in Salvador, Bahia, Brazil, affiliated with TV Globo. Owned by Rede Bahia, TV Bahia is the principal station of Rede Bahia de Televisão, a statewide television network composed of another five TV stations. TV Bahia's studios and transmitter are located on Prof. Aristídes Novis Street in the Federação district, in Salvador. The station signed on the air on March 10, 1985, 10 months after receiving its license from the federal government, making it the fourth-oldest television station in Bahia. It was inaugurated as a Rede Manchete affiliate. It became a partner of Rede Globo in 1987, after a troubled transition process, marked by a long judicial dispute with TV Aratu.

In the same year of its affiliation to Globo, it made its first big expansion of local programming, premiering two editions of the now-traditional newscast BATV and Jornal da Manhã, its first morning newscast. It was a pioneer among the Globo affiliates in the production of telenovelas, producing Danada de Sabida, inspired by the work of João Ubaldo Ribeiro, 1997. TV Bahia was also the first to use a helicopter for news coverage in the state, premiering in February 1999 the BahiaCop. On December 1, 2008, on the first anniversary of digital terrestrial television in Brazil, it became the first television station in Brazil's Northern and Northeast regions to start broadcasting its programming in this format, making Salvador the seventh city in Brazil to receive digital television.

History

Rede Manchete (1985–1987) 
On May 7, 1984, Televisão Bahia Ltda. received a concession to operate a television broadcasting service in Salvador in a decree issued by then-president João Figueiredo. The creation of TV Bahia was officially announced to the market on January 9, 1985, at a dinner held at the Bahiano Tennis Club. The new TV station in Salvador would be the first partner of Rede Manchete in Bahia. The event included a speech by Rubens Furtado, then-director general of the Rio de Janeiro network.

The station signed on for the first time on March 10, 1985, at 6:45 pm, with the transmission of an inauguration ceremony presented by Xuxa Meneghel, then host of the children's program Clube da Criança on Rede Manchete, as well as Governor of Bahia João Durval Carneiro, former governor Antônio Carlos Magalhães, and Catholic cardinal Avelar Brandão Vilela. After the ceremony, TV Bahia broadcast its inaugural program: Bahia de Todos os Santos, a documentary directed by filmmaker Nelson Pereira dos Santos. Initially, the station's shareholders were the entrepreneurs Antônio Carlos Magalhães Júnior (ACM Júnior), the former governor's son; and César Mata Pires.

TV Globo (1987–present) 
On November 10, 1986, Rede Globo made official the non-renewal of its affiliation contract with TV Aratu (channel 4), which had been its affiliate since 1969, ordering that the station cease broadcasting the network's programming on January 20, 1987, after the end of the extension of the end of the partnership. Globo had already expressed to TV Aratu its intention not to renew the affiliation contract on February 24 of that year, alleging dissatisfaction existing since 1984 on the part of Globo regarding technical and commercial problems of the then Bahia affiliate. The station chosen to replace TV Aratu was TV Bahia. Globo's final decision occurred shortly before Organizações Globo's purchase of NEC's Brazilian branch, in December of that year, which made opponents of Antônio Carlos Magalhães raise suspicions that that Globo president Roberto Marinho's decision was a way to thank him for a the minister's alleged support of the transaction.

On January 13, 1987, congressman Luís Viana Neto, one of the shareholders of TV Aratu, went to Brasília, along with 19 other deputies, to complain to president José Sarney regarding the situation. On January 15, Judge Luiz Fux of the 9th Civil Court of Rio de Janeiro granted TV Aratu an injunction preventing TV Bahia from retransmitting Globo's programming. The injunction was overturned on January 23, after TV Globo filed a writ of mandamus in the Court of Justice of the State of Rio de Janeiro to ensure the transmission of its programming by TV Bahia. At 5:58 pm, TV Bahia began to broadcast Globo's programming, after airing a statement informing the viewers about the new affiliation, which was also officially announced in the day's edition of Globo's national newscast Jornal Nacional. TV Aratu, however, ignored the decision, which meant that viewers in Bahia had two channels broadcasting Globo for three days in a row across the state.

By order of the regional directorate of National Department of Telecommunications (DENTEL), TV Aratu was forced to stop broadcasting Globo's programming on January 26. The station, then, began to broadcast the programming of Rede Manchete, and continued in court trying to nullify Globo's writ of mandamus. On March 31, judges Jorge Loretti, Narciso Pinto and Astrogildo Freitas of the 5th Civil Chamber of Rio de Janeiro, suspended Globo's writ of mandamus after judging that the network filed an appeal after the deadline. TV Aratu returned to rebroadcasting Globo programs, but TV Bahia did not immediately comply, resulting in both channels broadcasting the same programming until April 4, when TV Bahia resumed broadcasting Manchete programming. The court battle lasted for another three months until judge Nicolau Mary Júnior granted the injunction in favor of Globo on July 6; at that time, TV Bahia definitively resumed the affiliation with the network.

In June 1990, with the approach of the electoral period in Bahia, several candidates for state and federal deputies were installing pirate satellite dish systems in cities in the interior of the state that did not have translator stations, in order to insert, during the breaks and local spaces of Rede Globo's national programming, irregular advertisements of their candidacies. The practice led TV Bahia to install a transcoding system that prevented the unauthorized retransmission of the Globo signal.

On June 23, 2000, DTH operator Sky started to carry the station's programming, making making TV Bahia the fifth Globo station uplinked on the service, after the network's owned-and-operated stations in Belo Horizonte, Rio de Janeiro and São Paulo, in addition to Rio Grande do Sul affiliate RBS TV. A year later, after TV Bahia's lack of coverage of the  created controversy, rumors circulated that Globo would remove its affiliation due to a supposed deterioration in the relationship between the network and its affiliate. The move, however, was denied by Globo, which reaffirmed that it had a good relationship with Rede Bahia and renewed the contract with the local group on June 21.

In 2008, a dispute among TV Bahia shareholders began, with parties vying for control of the business. ACM Júnior won out, and four years later, in June 2012, César Mata Pires sold his stake to Campinas, São Paulo-based Grupo EP, owner of EPTV, a network composed of Globo-affiliated stations serving cities in São Paulo state and one in of Minas Gerais. Amidst the internal conflicts, there was an investment of R$9 million in a new transmitter, a new 160-meter (520 ft) antenna, and a new master control.

On July 21, 2012, Nelson Pelegrino, a candidate for mayor of Salvador, filed a lawsuit claiming that a report on the anniversary of Magalhães's death the previous's day featuring an interview with ACM Neto — his grandson, son of ACM Júnior, and a rival candidate — unfairly benefited Neto. On August 3, however, the Electoral Court of Brazil ruled the accusation as unfounded. According to Ângela Bacellar Batista, judge of the 18th Electoral Zone, there was no breach of equality before the law, as Mário Kertész, who was running for the same position, was also interviewed for the same report.

In the 2014 edition of the National Programming Award, held by Rede Globo, TV Bahia was awarded as the station with the largest audience among the affiliates of the Rio de Janeiro network throughout Brazil. In the same award, it was recognized for the call for the broadcast of the match between Juazeirense and Juazeiro, considered the best of its kind among the network's partners, and for the entertainment program Mosaico Baiano, which was one of the three best regional online programs of the year.

In May 2019, Rede Bahia carried out layoffs of several journalists and other employees of TV Bahia, after the company lost money in 2018. Documentation Center (CEDOC) and marketing team employees were fired, in addition to veteran newscaster Anna Valéria, who had been at the station for 31 years. That December, TV Bahia started to live broadcast its programming through Globoplay, Grupo Globo's streaming platform.

Programming

Entertainment programming

TV Bahia broadcasts two variety shows on Saturdays. Conexão Bahia deals with themes related to the culture and the daily life of Bahians, being hosted by playwright Aldri Anunciação. On Mosaico Baiano, presented by Pablo Vasconcelos, curiosities, clips, documentaries, special series, and film reviews, among other features, are shown.

Previous local non-news programs from TV Bahia have included The interview program, Michelle Marie Entrevista, an interview program hosted by Michelle Marie Magalhães (which featured reports by Wagner Moura); the variety show Arerê Geral (with Jackson Costa and Flávia Mendonça as presenters, which premiered on January 18, 2001; and Na Carona (hosted by Liliane Reis). On September 9, 2017, Aprovado, presented by Jackson Costa, was discontinued, and in its place, Conexão Bahia premiered on September 16, presented by Renata Menezes and Aldri Anunciação. Renata left the program and the station on February 18, 2019.

TV Bahia was the first Rede Globo affiliate to locally produce a telenovela. The attraction, entitled Danada de Sabida, premiered on January 7, 1997. Broadcast exclusively in the state, the production was inspired by the book Já Podeis da Pátria Filhos, by João Ubaldo Ribeiro, having been filmed in the cities of Cachoeira, São Francisco do Conde and São Gonçalo dos Campos.

Musical program Sente o Som, hosted by Camila Marinho and directed by Marcela Amorim, debuted on January 5, 2019. The seven episodes of the first season featured interviews with artists from Bahia and musical performances. Four episodes were broadcast in Portugal as part of programming for carnival on the  cable channel.

During the June Festivals of 2020, the station was criticized for the choice of Léo Santana, a pagode singer, for the presentation in São João do Nordeste, the São João festivities special program from Globo's owned-and-operated flagship station for the Northeast of Brazil based in Recife, Pernambuco, TV Globo Nordeste. Artists from different musical genres criticized the decision of choosing an artist from a genre other than forró, which is the most traditional musical style of these festivities. In a statement, TV Bahia ratified that it gave space to several forró artists during its programming for the month of June, through "special programs, reports and interviews about the São João festivities".

During 2020, TV Bahia produced several special attractions, aired on Saturdays. The station's first production was the special program Sessão Pet, presented by Pablo Vasconcelos and his pet dog, "Lilica", consisting in content about pet care, as well as stories of owners with their pets. Premiered on October 24, the attraction had three episodes. On November 28, Na Carona returned to the schedule after 13 years of its extinction. Also hosted by Pablo Vasconcelos, the relaunch program was dedicated to the city of Porto Seguro.

On December 11, 2020, the special program Conversa Preta, dedicated to debates on racism and representation and produced by black professionals from Rede Bahia, won the award for "best regional special program" among the attractions of this category produced by Rede Globo affiliates. The first season of the program had aired in August of that year, and the second was shown between October and December 2021.

Special programming

TV Bahia annually covers the Carnival of Salvador in February or March, with the transmission of the special program Bahia Folia, preempting several TV Globo and local programs, in addition to participation in the national network shows. Since 1994, the station has been promoting the Bahia Folia Trophy, a award that elects the most successful hit of the Bahian Carnival by popular vote.

Between 1999 and 2014, the station also live broadcast the Salvador Summer Festival, promoted by iContent, which is a subsidiary of Rede Bahia. In 2015, the event started to be broadcast by the Canais Globo's entertainment subscription channel Multishow, but TV Bahia still promotes the event in its schedule, in addition to airing highlights of the event.

Sports programming
TV Bahia is currently responsible for locally produce part of the transmissions of the Bahia's soccer clubs' matches for the Brazil Cup and Brazilian Championship (A and B series), when Globo holds the broadcast rights of these competitions. The main sports broadcasting team of the network is composed of Thiago Mastroianni as sportscaster and commentary by Gustavo Castelucci, in addition to reports by Danilo Ribeiro, Renan Pinheiro, and Sérgio Pinheiro.

From 2011 to 2020, TV Bahia was the official station for the Bahia Football Championship, replacing TV Itapoan, which had been broadcasting it since 2007. The station did not sign a contract with the Football Association of Bahia for 2021, and was replaced by TVE Bahia (channel 10), a TV Brasil-affiliated public television station, which became the championship's official station for the year.

On March 2, 2022, it was announced that TV Bahia, as well as pay-TV channels and streaming platforms of Grupo Globo, would broadcast matches of Vitória in the Brazilian Championship's C series. With this agreement, the matches played in the Barradão would be broadcast exclusively by Globo outlets, including the affiliated stations of Rede Bahia de Televisão, while the other matches would remain with the DAZN service, which has the rights of the competition for 2022.

News operation
TV Bahia currently broadcasts 23 hours, 20 minutes of locally produced newscasts each week (with 4 hours, 15 minutes each weekday and 2 hours, 5 minutes on Saturdays). The station also produces the 25-minute local sports show Globo Esporte Bahia, from Monday to Saturday, right after the newscast Bahia Meio Dia.

When TV Bahia launched, it produced one daily newscast, the evening Bahia em Manchete, and a daily sports program, Manchete Esportiva Bahia; planned from the start but not debuted until June was the public affairs program Bahia Debate, presented by Ney Gonçalves Dias, then with Rede Manchete. In July 1986, TV Bahia hired journalist Kátia Guzzo, presenter of variety program Mulher Total on then-SBT affiliate TV Itapoan (channel 5, now RecordTV Itapoan), to co-anchor Bahia Agora, the station's first noon newscast, accompanying journalist Paulo Brandão.

As a result of affiliating with Globo in January 1987, TV Bahia restructured its news operation to produce three daily newscasts. Paulo Gil remained host of the evening newscast, which was retitled BATV 2ª Edição on January 23. The noon newscast was rebranded BATV 1ª Edição the next day, and Guzzo was moved to the new morning show Jornal da Manhã, which premiered on January 26. Jornal da Manhã and BATV 1ª Edição readopted the Bahia Agora name from 1993 to July 1995, when the title began to be used for a feature magazine hosted by Anna Valéria.

In 1993, TV Bahia news teams were involved in at least two polemic episodes related to former governor Nilo Coelho, already owner of TV Aratu. On May 21, 1993, reporter Robson do Val and cameraman Carlos Eduardo de Oliveira were covering Nilo's testimony at the Federal Police headquarters in Salvador. The politician was accused of having slandered the then candidate for governor ACM during an interview to TV Aratu on August 4, 1990. As Nilo was entering the PF headquarters, his lawyer, the former Bahia justice secretary Marcelo Duarte, pushed Carlos Eduardo, who unbalanced and fell down a ladder with the camera.

Also in the same day, while leaving the PF headquarters, Nilo Coelho ran over photographer Marcelo Tinoco, of Grupo TV Bahia-ownered newspaper Correio da Bahia. The former governor fled without giving any help. The incident was also recorded by the station, which dedicated a large part of that day's edition of BATV to the incident, including the repercussion of the case among members of the press and politicians in Bahia. On June 30, 1993, Nilo Coelho went to the 1st Police Station of Salvador to testify about the run over, and on that occasion three of Nilo's supporters - among them the mayor of Bom Jesus da Lapa Artur Maia and state deputy Calmito Fernandes - assaulted with kicks a TV Bahia crew, this time composed of Casemiro Neto, a cameraman and his assistant.

Kátia Guzzo moved from BATV 1ª Edição to BATV 2ª Edição in 1996, when then-anchor Emmerson José opted to run for city council. On August 25, 1997, noon newscast Bahia Meio Dia premiered, replacing Bahia Agora and BATV 1ª Edição. The new newscast merged the two programs, being hosted by Anna Valéria, Casemiro Neto and Cristina Barude.

TV Bahia was the first television station in the state to use a helicopter for news coverage. The aircraft, which started to be used during the carnival coverage in February 1999, was called BahiaCop, and was used for live traffic bulletins, as well as reports and coverage that required aerial images. On August 29, 1999, TV Bahia premiered the information program Bahia Rural, with information about agribusiness and the interior of Bahia, presented by Valber Carvalho.

After 23 years leading the TV Bahia news department, journalist Carlos Libório retired on March 13, 2008; he was replaced as news director by Roberto Appel, former journalism manager at RBS TV. In the wake of the change in leadership, several changes in format were made, most notably the introduction of a two-anchor format to BATV; Guzzo was paired with Jefferson Beltrão, who moved from TV Itapoan. The pairing continued until 2015, when Beltrão was dismissed and Guzzo, who shifted to producing special reports for TV Bahia, who left the newscast after 19 years and became a special reporter for the station 1 month later. was replaced with Camila Marinho.

During the carnival of 2014, TV Bahia again debuted a helicopter for news coverage, debuting RedeCop. The aircraft provided services to the station until June 30, 2016, when TV Bahia's contract with the São Paulo-based company Time News, responsible for the equipment, was terminated.

As a result of increased competition from RecordTV, whose early afternoon newscast Balanço Geral BA rose to number one in the ratings in 2017, several changes were made. News director Appel retired and was replaced by Eurico Meira da Costa, who had held the same post at NSC TV, the Globo affiliate in Santa Catarina. In response, TV Bahia hired Jessica Senra from RecordTV Itapoan to host a revamped Bahia Meio Dia, which resulted in an immediate increase in ratings. Another action to improve the channel's midday ratings was taken on November 26, 2018, with the removal of Globo's health program Bem Estar from the weekly schedule to expand Bahia Meio Dia; as a result, it began airing 15 to 30 minutes earlier than similar newscasts on other Rede Globo affiliates. The station noted that low ratings for Globo network programming were harming its own local newscast. 2018 also saw the debut of a Saturday morning newscast, Bom Dia Sábado.

On February 26, 2018, the station committed a gaffe when it accidentally showed the body of a dead man during a report on Jornal da Manhã, which station policy typically prohibits. It appeared in the background of a live report for 40 seconds until it was spotted and reporter Vanderson Nascimento was alerted to position himself to block the corpse. João Gomes, then executive director of television at Rede Bahia, classified the event as a "human error" and further stated that the incident was not an attempt to gain ratings, citing TV Bahia's number-one position in that timeslot.

After two decades with the station hosting Bahia Rural, Valber Carvalho left TV Bahia in 2019, with Bahia Rural being hosted by two former reporters, Georgina Maynart and station veteran José Raimundo. Raimundo would leave TV Bahia in 2021 after 31 years.

On December 12, 2021, Camila Marinho, accompanied by cameraman Cleriston Santana, was attacked by supporters and members of president Jair Bolsonaro's security team as she tried to cover his visit to the city of Itamaraju, in the far southern of Bahia, due to heavy rains that wreaked havoc in the city and in the region. Her microphone was damaged by the municipality's secretary of works, Antonio Charbel, and she was also the victim of an attempted rear naked choke hold by one of the security guards, in addition to having a fanny pack stolen. Reporters Xico Lopes and Dário Cerqueira, from TV Aratu, were with TV Bahia reporters and were also attacked. The events were reported on TV Globo's national news programs, and the network repudiated the attacks on both teams. Rede Bahia also released a statement denouncing the action.

Notable on-air staff

Former
  (now with TV Aratu)
 
 
  (deceased)

Technical information

Subchannels

Analog-to-digital conversion
In November 2008, TV Bahia started its digital transmissions in high definition (HD) on an experimental basis on UHF channel 29. Digital broadcasts officially started on December 1, making the station a pioneer in terrestrial digital transmissions in the Northeast Region of Brazil and the capital of Bahia the seventh city to receive digital television in Brazil, exactly one year after the official launch in the country. On November 25, 2013, it began broadcasting its local newscasts in HDTV.

TV Bahia shut down its analog signal, over VHF channel 11, on September 27, 2017, as part of the federally mandated transition from analog to digital television. The station's digital signal remains on its pre-transition UHF channel 29, using virtual channel 11. After broadcasting the second leg of the Cruzeiro–Flamengo match for the Copa do Brasil, the signal was shut off at 11:59 pm and replaced by a notice from the Ministry of Science, Technology, Innovation and Communications (Brazil) (MCTIC) and ANATEL about the switch-off.

See also

 Rede Bahia de Televisão
 TV Globo

References

External links
 
 
 Institutional page
 G1 - Bahia (news)
 GE - Bahia (sports)
 
 
 

TV Globo affiliates
Companies based in Bahia
Television channels and stations established in 1985
1985 establishments in Brazil